Die Hards is the fourth album by the hardcore punk rock band The Casualties. It was released in 2001.

"Get Off My Back" is used in the video game Tony Hawk's American Wasteland.

Critical reception
In a positive review, Exclaim! wrote that the album "may be short on originality but it makes up for it in 'boots to the head' attitude." Maximum Rocknroll called it "more speedy snotty ... hardcore punk with lots of chanted choruses from all [the band's] mates."

Track listing 
"Nightmare" - 2:58
"City Council" - 2:05
"Ruining It All" - 1:26
"Get Off My Back" - 2:17
"Victims" - 2:58
"This Is Your Life" - 2:25
"Die Hards" - 2:34
"No Turning Back" - 2:18
"Can't Stop Us" - 2:43
"Mierda Mundial" - 2:34
"Punk Rock" - 2:01
"Divide and Conquer" - 2:22
"Made In N.Y.C." - 2:25

References

The Casualties albums
Street punk albums
2001 albums